Antiochtha longivincula is a moth in the family Lecithoceridae. It was described by Chun-Sheng Wu and Kyu-Tek Park in 1998. It is found in Sri Lanka.

The wingspan is 16–18 mm. The forewings are dark brown with a purple lustre. The pattern is dark milky yellow. The costal blotch is well developed and found at three-fourths of the costa. The termen is sinuate, with a yellowish white line along the margin. The hindwings are brown.

Etymology
The species name is derived from Latin longus (meaning long) and vinculum.

References

Moths described in 1998
Antiochtha